Leeuwarden (/; Town Frisian: Liwwadden; Leeuwarder dialect: Leewarden) is a city and municipality in Friesland, Netherlands, with a population of 123,107 (2019). It is the provincial capital and seat of the Provincial Council of Friesland.

The region has been continuously inhabited since the 10th century. It came to be known as Leeuwarden in the early 9th century AD and was granted city privileges in 1435. It is the main economic hub of Friesland, situated in a green and water-rich environment. Leeuwarden is a former royal residence and has a historic city centre, many historically relevant buildings, and a large shopping centre with squares and restaurants. Leeuwarden was awarded the title European Capital of Culture for 2018.

The Elfstedentocht (Eleven Cities Tour), an ice skating tour passing the eleven cities of Friesland, started and finished in Leeuwarden.

The following towns and villages within the municipality have populations in excess of 1,000 people: Leeuwarden, Stiens, Grou, Goutum, Wergea, Jirnsum, Reduzum, and Wirdum. The municipality is governed by the mayor Sybrand van Haersma Buma and a coalition of the Labour Party, Christian Democratic Appeal, and GreenLeft.

Etymology
The name "Leeuwarden" (or older variants of it) first came into use for Nijehove, the most important of the three villages (the other two being Oldehove and Hoek) which in the early 9th century merged into Leeuwarden (Villa Lintarwrde  825). There is much uncertainty about the origin of the city's name. Historian and archivist Wopke Eekhoff summed up a total of over 200 different spelling variants, of which Leeuwarden (Dutch), Liwwadden (Stadsfries), and Ljouwert (West Frisian) are still in use.

The second part of the name is easily explained: Warden, West Frisian/Dutch/Low German for an artificial dwelling-hill, is a designation of terps, reflecting the historical situation.

The first part of the name, leeuw, means lion in modern standard Dutch. This interpretation corresponds with the coat of arms adopted by the city, which features a heraldic lion. However, modern standard Dutch was not used in this region in the Middle Ages, when the city was called Lintarwrde. Some scholars argue that the name of the city is derived from leeu-, a corruption of luw- (Dutch for sheltered from the wind, cf. the maritime term leeward) or from lee- (a Dutch word for waterway). Sheltered landing place or harbour could be the original meaning. This suits the watery province of Friesland and the position of the original three villages at the end of an important estuary called Middelzee.

The name is also similar to that of the French commune Lewarde, located in the Nord Department, an originally Flemish-speaking area annexed to France in the 17th century. Western Flemish was related to Frisian and also to Saxon up to the 11th century.

History

The oldest remains of houses date back to the 2nd century AD in the Roman era and were discovered during an excavation near the Oldehove. Inhabited continuously since the 10th century, the city's first reference as a population centre is in German sources from 1285, and records exist of city privileges granted in 1435. Situated along the Middelzee, it was an active centre of maritime trade. The waterway silted-up in the 13th century.

The Grote of Jacobijnerkerk is the oldest building in the city. The 15th century was the period of the two opposing Frisian factional parties Vetkopers and Schieringers. The bastions and a moat were built in the period 1481–1494. In 1747 William IV, Prince of Orange was the last stadtholder residing in the Stadhouderlijk Hof. In the first half of the 19th century the fortifications were demolished.

The Jewish community of Leeuwarden was one of the earliest in the Netherlands aside from Amsterdam, and was first mentioned in 1645. By 1670, the city council granted a man referred to as "Jacob the Jew" (in Dutch) permission to build a Jewish cemetery, meaning that there were enough Jews living there to require a cemetery and other communal institutions. Land for 'The Jodenkerkhof' (Jews' cemetery) was purchased in 1679, near the Oldehove tower.

The first synagogue in the city was built in the 17th century as well, and was also used by the city's Catholics who were not allowed to build a house of worship of their own because of the Protestant city authorities. The Jewish community enjoyed generally good relations with authorities in the 18th century and continued to expand throughout the 18th and 19th centuries, reaching a peak population of 1,236 in 1860.

In 1901 the city's population was 32,203.

After occupation by German forces (1940-1945), the Royal Canadian Dragoons disobeyed direct orders on 15 April 1945 and charged into the heavily defended city, driving out German forces by the end of the next day. The anniversary of the liberation is celebrated by the Dragoons and the city, who fly each other's flags on the day.

Kneppelfreed was an incident on 16 November 1951 in front of the courthouse at Wilhelminaplein (Wilhelmina Square), when the police used batons against Frisian language activists during a protest against the exclusive use of Dutch in the courts. A committee of inquiry recommended that the Frisian language should receive legal status as a minority language.

On 19 October 2013, a fire broke out in a clothes shop on a busy pedestrian street. The fire started late in the afternoon and burned through the night, destroying five shops and eleven flats. The only casualty was a 24-year-old man who was living in one of the flats. The birthplace of Mata Hari was at first thought to be destroyed, but survived, albeit with considerable smoke and water damage.

Heraldry
The coat of arms of Leeuwarden is the official symbol of the municipality. It consists of a blue escutcheon, a golden lion, and a crown. The fact that Leeuwarden carries a lion in its seal seems logical, considering that "Leeuw" is Dutch for "Lion". However, it is very plausible the oldest name of the city conceals an indication of water rather than an animal, and some sources suggest that the lion may have only been added after the name became official. It is also possible the coat of arms was a gift to the city from the powerful Minnema family.

Geography

Leeuwarden is located centrally in Friesland. The military Leeuwarden Air Base lies northwest of the city. East of the city lies recreational area and nature reserve De Groene Ster. It contains the windmill Himriksmole, a golf course and AquaZoo Friesland.

Population centres
On 1 January 2014 parts of the neighbouring Boarnsterhim municipality were added to Leeuwarden. On 1 January 2018 it was enlarged by Leeuwarderadeel and parts of former municipality of Littenseradiel.

Hamlets
The hamlets within the municipality are: Abbenwier, Angwier, Baarderbuorren, Bartlehiem (partially), De Him, De Hoek, De Trije Romers, Domwier, Finsterbuorren, Fûns, Groote Bontekoe, Goatum, Hesens, Hoarne, Hoptille, It Hoflân, It Wiel , Marwert, Midsbuorren, Narderbuorren, Noardein, Oude Schouw (partially), Poelhuzen, Rewert (partially), Skillaerd, Skrins, Suderbuorren, Suorein, Tichelwurk, Truerd, Tsienzerbuorren, Tsjaard, Tsjeintgum, Vierhuis, Vrouwbuurtstermolen (partially), Wammert and Wieuwens

Climate

Culture

Museums

Museums in the city of Leeuwarden: 
 Fries Museum. An art, culture and history museum. The building (2013) was designed by Hubert-Jan Henket.
 Fries Verzetsmuseum, a museum that documents the impact of World War II on Friesland. The museum is part of the Fries Museum.
 Princessehof Ceramics Museum, a ceramics museum.
 Pier Pander Museum, an art museum dedicated to the works of sculptor Pier Pander.
 Natuurmuseum Fryslân, a natural history museum.
 The Other Museum. Collections: old-timers, model trains, lace and photography, radio and Meccano.
 Tresoar, a historical centre and museum with archives about Friesland.
 Fries Landbouwmuseum, an agricultural museum.

Architecture
There are over 800 Rijksmonuments (national heritage sites) in the municipality of Leeuwarden. The Oldehove, a leaning unfinished church tower, is a symbol of the city. Other well-known buildings in the city centre include the Kanselarij (former chancellery), the Stadhouderlijk Hof (former residence of the stadtholders of Friesland), the city hall (1715), the Waag (old weigh house), the Saint Boniface church (an important part of the neogothic movement) and the Centraal Apotheek, a pharmacy in the Art Nouveau style. The Blokhuispoort is a former prison that has been transformed into a public library, hostel and restaurant.

The Froskepôlemolen (built in 1896), is the last surviving windmill to have stood in Leeuwarden. The remains of the Cammingha-Buurstermolen were demolished in 2000. The Slauerhoffbrug is a fully automatic bascule bridge named after the poet Jan Jacob Slauerhoff. It uses two arms to swing a section of road in and out of place within the road itself. This movable bridge is also known as the 'Flying' Drawbridge.

Cultural events and festivals 

On 6 September 2013 Leeuwarden was voted European Capital of Culture for the year 2018. Many events were organised throughout the year.  The largest art project was the 11Fountains, fountains in the Frisian eleven cities. The Love Fountain, located in front of the train station, was designed by artist Jaume Plensa. The fountain is seven metres high and consists of two white heads of a boy and a girl, their eyes closed and dreaming.

Annual music festivals are Cityrock, Dancetour, Welcome To The Village, Into the Grave, Explore the North and Fries straatfestival. Other festivals are Noordelijk Film Festival (an event for film makers), photofestival Noorderlicht and the Media Art festival. Other events are Racing Expo and a large flower market (held on Ascension Day). There is also a weekly cattle market.

Transport

Leeuwarden railway station (opened on 27 October 1863) is the main railway station of Leeuwarden. It is a terminus station of the NS railway line from Zwolle. Regional trains, served by Arriva, operate to Groningen in the east, Harlingen in the west and Stavoren in the southwest. The other stations in the municipality are Leeuwarden Camminghaburen, and Grou-Jirnsum. A fourth station Leeuwarden Werpsterhoeke was planned to be opened after 2018.

Near the train station is the bus station. Arriva runs several city, regional and national buses. Route 66 Leeuwarden-Holwerd connects with the ferry to Ameland, bus route 50 to Lauwersoog connects with the departures of the ferry to Schiermonnikoog and route 350 via the Afsluitdijk connects to Alkmaar in North Holland.

The motorway A31 passes Leeuwarden and the A32 connects Leeuwarden to Meppel. The Van Harinxmakanaal is a major canal and connects Harlingen to Leeuwarden.

Education

Leeuwarden has a number of respected schools of applied science (HBO in Dutch), (21,480 students in 2017), such as the Van Hall Instituut (agricultural and life sciences) and the NHL Stenden University of Applied Sciences (hotel management, economical and media management). In addition to higher education, the city is also home to three regional vocational schools (MBO): the Friese Poort, Friesland College, and Nordwin College.

Although the city has no university of its own, several satellite campuses are located here, including Campus Fryslân (University of Groningen) and Dairy Campus (Wageningen University and Research).

Technological Top Institute Wetsus does research into water management and related technologies. Centre of Expertise Water Technology (CEW) is the knowledge and innovation centre for applied research and product development in the field of water technology and the Wadden Academy to study and research the Wadden Sea.

Economy

Among the 10 largest employers in Leeuwarden are Medical Center Leeuwarden (MCL), ING, The Central Judicial Collection Agency (CJIB), Achmea, NHL Stenden University of Applied Sciences, Leeuwarden Air Base and FrieslandCampina. WTC Expo is the largest events complex in the Northern Netherlands.

Sports

The city's local football team, SC Cambuur, are playing in the first tier Eredivisie after a five-year absence, winning and gaining promotion from the 2020-21 Eerste Divisie. Their home ground is the Cambuurstadion, which has a capacity of 10,500. The city's basketball team, Aris Leeuwarden, has played in the Dutch Basketball League since 2004.

Loop Leeuwarden is an annual road running competition (5 km, 10 km and half marathon races). The race was first held in 1985 and takes place in May. It attracts amateur runners. The city of Leeuwarden has two sailing boats (skûtsje) racing in the yearly sailing competition Skûtsjesilen.

The Elfstedenhal is a sport venue. The stadium is used for long track speed skating, short track speed skating, ice hockey, figure skating and curling. The 400m indoor speed skating oval is named after speed skater Atje Keulen-Deelstra. The ice hockey club is IJshockeyclub Capitals Leeuwarden (IJCCL).

Leeuwarden is the starting and finishing point for the celebrated Elfstedentocht, a  speed skating race over the Frisian waterways that is held when winter conditions in the province allow.  it last took place in January 1997, preceded by the races of 1986 and 1985. In 1986, the Dutch king Willem-Alexander participated in the Eleven cities tour, with the pseudonym W.A. van Buren, which is the pseudonym of the royal family of the Netherlands.

Leeuwarden will host the World Flying Disc Federation 2020 World Ultimate and Guts Championships from the 11th to the 18th of July. The event is expected to have over 2500 athletes from 40 countries.

Media
The Leeuwarder Courant and Friesch Dagblad are daily newspapers mainly written in Dutch (published by the NDC Mediagroep). Omrop Fryslân is a public broadcaster with radio and TV programs mainly in Frisian.

Notable residents

 Lawrence Alma-Tadema (1836–1912), knighted painter
 Eva and Abraham Beem (1932/1934–1944), young Jewish Holocaust victims
 Cornelis Botke (1887–1954), painter and etcher
 Cisca Dresselhuys (born 1943), journalist and magazine editor
 Esmée van Eeghen (1918–1944), resistance fighter in World War II
 Dirk van Erp (1860–1933), artisan and metalsmith
 M. C. Escher (1898–1972), graphic artist
Richard Hageman (1881–1966), conductor, pianist, composer, and actor 
 Willem van Haren (1710–1768), poet
 Havank (1904–1964), writer, journalist, and translator
 Wilhelmina van Idsinga (1788–1819), painter
 Johannes Henricus Gerardus Jansen (1868–1936), archbishop
 Wijerd Jelckama ( 1490–1523), military commander
 Mata Hari (1876–1917), exotic dancer and courtesan, possible double agent 
 Hendrik Niehoff (1495– 1561), pipe organ maker
 Piet Paaltjens (1835–1894), minister and romantic author
 Joachim van Plettenberg (1739–1793), colonial governor
 Tjitske Reidinga (born 1972), actress 
Jan Jacob Slauerhoff (1898–1936), poet and novelist
 Abraham Lambertsz van den Tempel (1622-1672), painter
 Pieter Jelles Troelstra (1860–1930), politician
 Cornelis Adriaan Lobry van Troostenburg de Bruyn (1857–1904), chemist
 Saskia van Uylenburg (1612–1642), wife of the painter Rembrandt van Rijn
 Lodewijk Caspar Valckenaer (1715–1785), classical scholar
 Campegius Vitringa (1659-1722), theologian
 Hans Vredeman de Vries (1527– 1607), architect, painter, and engineer
 Harm Wiersma (born 1953), draughts player and politician
 William IV, Prince of Orange (1711-1751), stadtholder

Politics

In the Netherlands, a municipality is governed by the college of mayor and aldermen and the municipal council. Sybrand van Haersma Buma of the CDA has been mayor of Leeuwarden since 26 August 2019. Since the 2014 municipal elections, the Labour Party (3 aldermen), Christian Democratic Appeal (2 aldermen), PAL GroenLinks (1 alderman) form a coalition. The municipal council of Leeuwarden has 39 seats.

As provincial capital, Leeuwarden is also the seat of the King's Commissioner Arno Brok and the Provincial Council of Friesland.

International relations

The city of Leeuwarden is twinned with

References

Bibliography

External links

 
 Tourist information about Leeuwarden

 
Cities in Friesland
Cities in the Netherlands
Municipalities of Friesland
Populated places in Friesland
Provincial capitals of the Netherlands